Merhonour was a ship of the Tudor navy of England. It was built in 1590 by Mathew Baker at Woolwich Dockyard, and was rebuilt by Phineas Pett I at Woolwich between 1612 and 1615, being relaunched on 6 March 1615 as a 40-gun royal ship. It was then laid up at Chatham, only briefly returning to service in the 1630s. It was nevertheless considered to be one of the fastest ships in the Navy.

Merhonour was sold out of the navy in 1650.

Notes

Citations

References

Lavery, Brian (2003) The Ship of the Line - Volume 1: The development of the battlefleet 1650-1850. Conway Maritime Press. .
 

Ships of the English navy
16th-century ships